Charles Kilbourne Williams (January 24, 1782March 9, 1853) was an American lawyer and politician. He served as
Chief Justice of the Vermont Supreme Court from 1834 to 1846 and as 20th governor of Vermont from 1850 to 1852.

Biography
Williams was born in Cambridge, Massachusetts, Middlesex County to Samuel Williams and Jane Kilbourne Williams. He moved with his family to Rutland, Vermont in 1790. He graduated from Williams College in 1800.  In 1834, he received the honorary degree of LL.D. from Middlebury.

Williams was elected to the Vermont House of Representatives and served from 1809 to 1810, 1811 to 1812, 1814 to 1816, and 1820 to 1822. He served in the Vermont Militia as a major during the War of 1812. He was promoted to the rank of brigadier general and became commander of a division. He was again elected to the Vermont House of Representatives and served from 1814 to 1815, 1820 to 1821 and in 1849.

He served as Rutland County State's Attorney from 1814 to 1815, and as a justice of the Vermont Supreme Court from 1822 to 1823, succeeding William Brayton. He was Vermont's US Collector of Customs from 1826 to 1829. In 1827 he was State Commissioner for common schools. He served as chief justice of the Vermont Supreme Court from 1834 to 1845. Williams was the author of a precedent setting opinion on the unconstitutionality of legislative acts passed to nullify judicial decisions.

Williams ran unsuccessfully for Governor of Vermont in 1842 as an abolitionist candidate. He served as President of the Council of Censors in 1848. Elected as a Whig, Williams served as Governor of Vermont from 1850 to 1852. While in office, the Habeas Corpus Act was passed, showing the strong anti-slavery sentiments in Vermont. He was reelected in 1851 and did not seek reelection to a third one-year term in 1853.

He served as a Trustee of Middlebury College and as President of the Williams College Alumni Association.

Family life
Williams married Lucy Green Langdon, and they had nine children together.

Williams was the son in law of Congressman Chauncey Langdon.

Death
Williams died in Rutland on March 9, 1853, and is interred at Evergreen Cemetery in Rutland, Vermont.

References

External links

The Political Graveyard
National Governors Association
The Official State Website of Vermont
Ancestry.com: The History of Rutland County

1782 births
1853 deaths
Governors of Vermont
People from Rutland (town), Vermont
Vermont Whigs
Williams College alumni
Members of the Vermont House of Representatives
Vermont lawyers
State's attorneys in Vermont
American militiamen in the War of 1812
Justices of the Vermont Supreme Court
Whig Party state governors of the United States
19th-century American politicians
Burials at Evergreen Cemetery (Rutland, Vermont)
19th-century American judges
19th-century American lawyers